Deirdre Frances Jordan, AC, MBE (born 18 September 1926) is an Australian academic and educator.

Born in  Loxton, South Australia, Australia on 18 September 1926 to Clement and Helena (née Roberts) Jordan, she was educated at St Aloysius College in Adelaide, South Australia, and joined the Religious Sisters of Mercy when she was 19. With a Bachelor of Arts behind her, Sister Jordan (then known as Sister Mary Campion) took on the position of Principal at St Aloysius College in 1954, remaining in that role until 1968.

While at St Aloysius, she completed a master's degree in education at the University of Adelaide, becoming the first woman to do so. This led to a position as a lecturer at the University of Adelaide in Sociology, where she remained until 1988. During this period she undertook a number of study tours, including to Tanzania, China and South America.

She was appointed Pro-Chancellor of The Flinders University of South Australia in 1981 and subsequently Chancellor in 1988. Retiring from the post in 2002 (delayed in order to fight plans for a merger between Flinders University and the University of Adelaide), she was granted the title of Emeritus Chancellor later that year.

Sister Deirdre Jordan became a Member of the Order of the British Empire (MBE) on 1 January 1969 for services to education, and was appointed a Companion of the Order of Australia (AC) on 26 January 1989.

References

Academic staff of the University of Adelaide
Academic staff of Flinders University
People from Loxton, South Australia
Companions of the Order of Australia
1926 births
Living people